There are various formal and informal subdivisions of London Borough of Barking and Dagenham and of parts of that borough.

Pre 1965 boroughs
Since 1994 the borough has comprised the areas of the former Borough of Barking (in the main - some parts went to Newham in 1965) and of Dagenham, plus most of the part of the Becontree Estate that was originally in the Borough of Ilford.

Postal Geography

17 Postcode sectors in (7 postcode areas) cover the borough: IG11 7, 8, 9 and 0; RM5 2; RM6 4, 5 and 6; RM7 0; RM8 1, 2 and 3; RM9 4, 5, and 6 RM10 7, 8, 9. All of RM8 and RM9 are wholly within B&D and for practical purposes so is all of RM10. The other areas extend into neighbouring boroughs (Newham, Redbridge and Havering). All sectors of IG11 [4 sectors], RM6 [3], RM8 [3], RM9 [3] and RM10 [3] are at least partly in B&D. [RM9 9 and IG11 1 are ignored for this purpose, being special cases such as postcodes for PO boxes and the borough returning officer.]

The Post Towns Barking, Dagenham, and Romford each cover part of the borough (and beyond).

(In fact the borough also extends into LONDON E6 2--, but this is negligible as the area comprises a roundabout and slip roads with no residences or businesses.)

Neighbourhoods
This is a list of 13 'Neighbourhoods' (source unknown) without defined boundaries.

Note that 'Barking' and 'Dagenham' are the names both of post towns and of Neighbourhoods in this table.

Citizen's Alliance Network Neighbourhoods

Seven neighbourhoods, between them covering the whole borough, announced by the council's CAN in February 2022.: 1 Barking Town; 2 Becontree; 3 Becontree Heath to Rush Green; 4 Chadwell Heath and Marks Gate; 5 Dagenham Dock, Beam Park and the Stamping Plant; 6 Dagenham East, the Village and beyond; 7 Thames and Riverside.

These names are similar and in some cases identical to the 'strategic sub-areas' listed below.

In the Council's Local Plan

These are the geographical areas that the Local Authority splits the borough into for spatial planning purposes, sometimes attempting to engage the population in identifying with the areas/names chosen.

Character areas

These 11 "character areas" were proposed in Barking & Dagenham Council's 'Issues and Options' report on page 50 (list) and 51 (map). The character area names are unique within the list.

"We would appreciate your feedback on what you think the different places are in Barking and Dagenham. To help with this we've attempted to define what we think are the eleven places that make up the borough.
Becontree; Becontree Heath; Barking Riverside/Thames View; Barking Town Centre; Chadwell Heath; Dagenham East; Dagenham Riverside; Faircross, Leftley and Eastbury; Goodmayes; Marks Gate; Rush Green."

The omission of Upney - an old place name and the name of a London Underground station - from this list is noteworthy.

Strategic sub-areas

These 7 'strategic sub-areas' are on a map published by Barking & Dagenham Council in September 2019:

Barking & The Roding; Becontree Heath & Rush Green; Becontree; Chadwell Heath & Marks Gate; Dagenham Dock & Beam Park; Dagenham East & The Village; Thames & Riverside

Draft local plan 2019-2034

Similar (if not identical) areas were subsequently used, albeit with some names modified, in the council's Draft Local Plan 2019-2034:

1: Barking Town Centre and the River Roding

2: Thames Road, Barking Riverside and Castle Green

3: Dagenham Dock, Beam Park and the Ford Stamping Plant **

4: Becontree

5: Chadwell Heath and Marks Gate

6: Becontree Heath and Rush Green

7: Dagenham East and Dagenham Village

** in August 2021 Peabody started consulting on their plans to redevelop the Ford Stamping Plant site: The development has been dubbed 'Dagenham Green'.

September 2020 consultation version of the local plan

This version of the local plan lists sub-area 1 above as: 'Barking, the River Roding'

Sub areas 2021

In the Autumn 2021 version of the council's Local Plan the 7 sub areas are:

Barking and the River Roding; Thames Riverside; Dagenham Dock and Freeport; Becontree and Heathway; Chadwell Heath and Marks Gate; Becontree Heath and Rush Green; Dagenham East and Village

Electoral wards and polling districts

Wards from 2010
The borough is divided into electoral wards - these 17 from 2010 until 4 May 2022: Abbey, Alibon, Becontree, Chadwell Heath, Eastbrook, Eastbury, Gascoigne, Goresbrook, Heath, Longbridge, Mayesbrook, Parsloes, River, Thames, Valence, Village and Whalebone. Each ward was represented by three Councillors.

Polling districts 2010

From 2010 until 4 May 2022 the borough was divided into 66 polling districts, each denoted by a two letter code.

Wards from 2022

From 27 October 2020 until 31 May 2021 the Electoral Commission consulted on ward boundary changes to take effect from the 5 May 2022 elections. The council proposed to continue having 51 Councillors, but to increase the number of wards to 19. The 17 wards named above would be kept, though with changed boundaries, and two new wards - Roding and Creekmouth - each with 2 members - would be added. Eastbrook, Gascoigne, Heath, and Parsloes wards would become 2 member wards. The estimated borough-wide electorate at the time of the change will be 17,4322, equivalent to 3418 electors per Councillor. The proposed changes entail each ward boundary being drawn so that the electors per Councillor is within 10% of that borough average.

The Boundary Commission's decision in August 2021  has the following 19 wards:

Abbey AB [ii] (3), Alibon AL [ii] (3), Barking Riverside BR [n] (4), Beam BM [n] (3), Becontree BE [ii] (3),  Chadwell Heath CH (5), Eastbrook & Rush Green ER [ii] [n] (2), Eastbury EY (3), Gascoigne GC (3), Goresbrook GK (4), Heath HE [ii] (3), Longbridge LB (4), Mayesbrook MA (4), Northbury NB [n] (3), Parsloes PA (6), Thames View TV [ii] [n] (3), Valence VA (5), Village VE (4), and Whalebone WH (5).

The two letter mnemonic abbreviations are from the Local Government Ward Boundary Review

[ii] = Two member wards - 6 off. The other 13 are three member. Total number of members (Councillors) remains at 51.

[n] = New ward name - 5 off. 3 lost Ward names - Eastbrook, River, Thames

(x) = no of polling districts

The boundary changes would mean that Alibon, Goresbrook, Parsloes, Whalebone and Valence wards will each straddle the boundary between the Barking, and Dagenham-and-Rainham parliamentary constituencies.

Polling districts from 2022
From May 2022 the borough is divided into 70 polling districts each denoted by a three character code comprising a 2 letter mnemonic ward code - see above - and a single numeric (1-6).

Parliamentary constituencies

From 2010 two constituencies covered the borough - Dagenham-and-Rainham, which includes the 6 easternmost 2010 wards of B&D (Chadwell Heath, Eastbrook, Heath, River, Village and Whalebone) and 3 wards in LB Havering; and Barking, which comprises the other 11 2010 wards of B&D. The Boundary Commission has proposed that in 2023 Valence Ward should transfer from Barking into Dagenham-and-Rainham and Chadwell Heath Ward from Dagenham-and-Rainham into Ilford South, meaning that the borough would extend into 3 constituencies.

BT Telephone Exchange Areas
Barking, Dagenham and Goodmayes British Telecom exchanges (in the London Telephone Region - 020 numbers) and Romford (01708) cover the borough between them.

'Nextdoor' Neighbourhoods

Social networking site Nextdoor (formerly Streetlife)  divides B&D into these 51 neighbourhoods. Numbers added for ease of reference.

01 Andrews Corner-Winding Way,
02 Barking Park & Faircross,
03 Barking Riverside,
04 Barking Town Centre,
05 Beam Valley & The Leys,
06 Becontree & Parsloes,
07 Becontree Station,
08 Broad Street,
09 Central Park,
10 Chadwell Heath,
11 Chequers,
12 Dagenham Dock,
13 Dagenham East,
14 Dagenham Heathway,
15 Dagenham Park,
16 Dagenham Village,
17 East Castle Green (see 49),
18 Eastbrook,
19 Five Elms,
20 Freshwharf,
21 Frizlands Lane,
22 Gascoigne,
23 Goresbrook Village,
24 Great Fleete,
25 Greatfields,
26 Harts Lane,
27 Heathway,
28 Leftley Estate-Mayesbrook Park,
29 Longbridge Road,
30 Marks Gate,
31 Mayesbrook,
32 Martins Corner,
33 North Becontree Heath (see 39),
34 North Eastbury (see 40),
35 North Valence (see 41),
36 Oxlow Lane-Hunters Hall Road,
37 Rippleside,
38 Scrattons Farm Estate,
39 South Becontree Heath (see 33),
40 South Eastbury (see 34),
41 South Valence (see 35),
42 St George's-Osborne Square,
43 Thames View,
44 The Fiddlers,
45 The Triangle,
46 Upney Lane,
47 Valence Circus,
48 Waverley Gardens,
49 West Castle Green (see 17),
50 Westbury,
51 Whalebone Lane South.

Controlled Car Parking Zones
As at October 2021 these did not cover the whole borough, but several of them are being expanded (depending on the outcome of consultations) and new zones have been proposed or introduced since. 26 zones are listed here in alphabetical order of their short code. The information is derived from Ringgo  and the location codes range from 27000 - 27061, non continuously. Not all of the zones listed here are known to be in actual use.

Barking Town Centre AM, Barking Town Centre B, Becontree BEC, Barking Town Centre C, Chadwell Heath CH, Barking Town Centre D, Dagenham East DE, Barking Town Centre E, Barking Town Centre ES, Barking Town Centre F, Barking Town Centre FG, Barking Town Centre G, Gascoigne Estate GE, Barking Town Centre H, Barking Town Centre HR, Heathway HW, Barking Town Centre I, Barking Town Centre J, Barking Town Centre K, Barking Town Centre L,
Lancaster Avenue LA, Longbridge Academy LB, Millard Terrace MT1, Barking RC, Barking Thames View TH, Barking Town Centre TV, Upney UP.

Becontree Estate numbered sections

These were used for planning purposes when the Becontree estate was being planned in the early 20th century. The numbers of the sections reflect the order in which the estate was constructed. A key plan  shows sections numbered 1-17, section 6a, and a 'section' for green spaces. The numbered sections and section 6a are grouped by place names - Barking (6 sections:  12-17); Dagenham (7 sections: 2, 3, 6, 6a, 8, 9 and 11); Ilford (2 sections: 1 and 5) and Valence (3 sections: 4, 7, 10). Barking, Dagenham and Ilford were the names of the boroughs/parishes in parts of which the estate was built, but by 1994, barring a few houses that are in LB Redbridge, the whole estate was in LB Barking-&-Dagenham

References

 
Lists of places in London